Boddy is a surname of English origin. The name refers to:
Alexander Boddy (1854–1930), English vicar of the Anglican Church; one of the founders of Pentecostalism in Britain
Bill Boddy (1913–2011), British motoring journalist
George Boddy (b. 1937), RAF officer
Gregg Boddy (b. 1949), Canadian professional ice hockey player
Ian Boddy (contemporary), British electronic musician and composer
Manchester Boddy (1891–1967), Los Angeles newspaper publisher and Democratic senate candidate in 1950.
Mr. Boddy, a character from the film Clue.